Dragon & lion dance at the 2007 Asian Indoor Games was held in Macao Forum, Macau, China from 1 November to 2 November 2007.

Medalists

Dragon dance

Northern lion

Southern lion

Medal table

Results

Dragon dance

Compulsory exercise
1 November

Optional exercise
2 November

Northern lion

Compulsory exercise
1 November

Optional exercise
2 November

Southern lion

Compulsory exercise
1 November

Optional exercise
2 November

References
 2007 Asian Indoor Games official website

2007 Asian Indoor Games events